Project Wolf Hunting is a 2022 South Korean science fiction action thriller film directed by Kim Hong-sun, starring Seo In-guk and Jang Dong-yoon. The film takes place on a cargo ship used to transport dangerous criminals from Manila, Philippines to Busan, South Korea. It premiered at 2022 Toronto International Film Festival on September 16, 2022, and was released on September 21, 2022 in theaters in South Korea.

Synopsis 
After an extradition of criminals from Manila was disrupted by suicide attack at the airport, officials decided that the next group of criminals should be transported by sea.
While under heavily armed guard, the dangerous convicts aboard a cargo ship unite in a coordinated escape attempt that soon escalates into a bloody, all-out riot. But as the fugitives continue their brutal campaign of terror, they soon discover that not even the most vicious among them is safe from the horror they have unknowingly unleashed from the darkness below deck.

Cast 
 Seo In-guk as Park Jong-doo 
 Jang Dong-yoon as Lee Do-il
 Choi Gwi-hwa as Alpha 
 Park Ho-san as Lee Seok-woo 
 Jung So-min as Lee Da-yeon
 Ko Chang-seok as Go Kun-bae
 Jang Young-nam as Choi Myeong-ju
 Sung Dong-il as Oh Dae-woong 
 Son Jong-hak as Soo-cheol 
 Lee Sung-wook as Kyung-ho
 Hong Ji-yoon as Song Ji-eun
 Jung Moon-sung as Kyu-tae 
 Lim Ju-hwan as Representative director
 Kwon Soo-hyun as Jin Kang-woo 
 Jung Sung-il as Detective Jung Pil-sung
 Kim Kang-hoon as Lee Do-il's son
 Lee Hong-nae as Piercing
 Shin Seung-hwan as Mantis

Production 
On April 14, 2021, it was reported that the filming had ended.

Release 
The film was released theatrically on September 21, 2022, in South Korea by The Contents On. Finecut acquired international distribution rights of the film. The film was invited to the Midnight Madness section at 2022 Toronto International Film Festival on September 16, 2022. The film premiered in North America on October 7 and the film's rights were sold in 41 countries.

Accolades

References

External links
 
 
 
 
 

2022 films
2020s South Korean films
2020s Korean-language films
South Korean crime action films
South Korean action thriller films
South Korean science fiction action films